"MJB da MVP" is a song by American recording artist Mary J. Blige featuring rapper 50 Cent, taken from her seventh studio album The Breakthrough (2005). The Cool & Dre-produced track is a cover version of "Hate It or Love It" as performed by The Game and 50 Cent, the first of which also provided a new verse for the official remix of the song. In the new vocal part, Blige relates the ups and downs of her career and expresses thanks to Dr. Dre and The Game for letting her work on a track. She mentions her start in 1991, the release of her first five albums and her sadness by the death of her friend, R&B singer Aaliyah.

Released as a promotional single, "MJB da MVP" was first played on US radio in 2005 and charted at number 75 on the Billboard Hot 100 based on airplay. In December 2006, one year after the song's initial airplay, the song was released in the United Kingdom as the lead single from her compilation album Reflections (A Retrospective). "MJB da MVP" was added to the playlist of UK radio station BBC Radio 1 on November 22, while the video for the single, a montage video, was released later that week. The single managed to chart at number 33 on the UK Singles Chart, where it became Blige's twenty-seventh top 40 entry.

Formats and track listings
UK CD & 12" Vinyl

 "MJB Da MVP" (alternate album version)   
 "Family Affair"  
 "Be Without You" (Moto Blanco vocal mix)

Dutch CD Promo

 "MJB Da MVP"

Charts

Weekly charts

References

2005 singles
Mary J. Blige songs
Songs written by Mary J. Blige
Songs written by Cool (record producer)
Songs written by The Game (rapper)
Songs written by 50 Cent
Songs written by Allan Felder
Songs written by Dre (record producer)